Patriarch Filaret (secular name Mykhailo Antonovych Denysenko, born 23 January 1929) is a Ukrainian religious leader, currently serving as the primate and Patriarch of the Ukrainian Orthodox Church – Kyiv Patriarchate. The Orthodox Church of Ukraine, that he left in 2019, views him as the Honorary Patriarch emeritus. He was a former Metropolitan of Kyiv of the Russian Orthodox Church (1966–1992). After joining the Kyiv Patriarchate, he was defrocked and in 1997 excommunicated by the ROC.

On 11 October 2018, the Patriarchate of Constantinople reinstated him in church communion. However, while restored to the episcopate, the Ecumenical Patriarchate never recognised him as Patriarch and views him as the former Metropolitan of Kyiv.

On 15 December 2018, the Ukrainian Orthodox Church of the Kyiv Patriarchate united with the Ukrainian Autocephalous Orthodox Church and some members of the Ukrainian Orthodox Church (MP) into the Orthodox Church of Ukraine; the Ukrainian Orthodox Church of the Kyiv Patriarchate thus ceased to exist.

Early years
Mykhailo Denysenko was born on 23 January 1929, into a worker's family in the village of Blahodatne in the Amvrosiivsky Raion (district), now in the Donetsk Oblast (province) in Eastern Ukraine. His parents were Anton and Melania Denysenko. He obtained his theological education at the Odessa Seminary (Moscow Patriarchate) and the Moscow Theological Academy where he became a close associate of Patriarch Alexius I of Moscow. He took monastic vows in 1950 assuming the monastic name Filaret and was ordained hierodeacon in January 1950 and priest in June 1951. After his graduation he stayed at the Moscow Theological Academy as a professor (from 1952) and Senior Assistant to the Academy inspector. In 1956 he was appointed Inspector of the Theological Seminary in Saratov and elevated to the rank of hegumen. In 1957 he was appointed Inspector of the Kyiv Theological Seminary. In July 1958 he was further elevated to the rank of Archimandrite and appointed seminary rector.

Hierarch of the Russian Orthodox Church
In 1961, Filaret served in the mission of the Russian Orthodox Church (ROC) to the Patriarch of Alexandria. In January 1962 Filaret was elected vicar Bishop of the Leningrad Eparchy and, in February, was ordained bishop in Leningrad by Metropolitan Pimen (later Moscow Patriarch) and other bishops. Filaret was appointed to several diplomatic missions of the Russian Orthodox Church and from 1962 to 1964 served as ROC Bishop of Vienna and Austria. In 1964 he returned to Moscow as the Bishop of Dmitrov and rector of the Moscow Theological Academy and Seminary.

In 1966, he became archbishop of Kyiv and Halych, thus becoming one of the most influential hierarchs in the Russian Orthodox Church, where the office of the Kyiv Metropolitan is highly regarded. At that time he also became a permanent member of the Holy Synod, the highest collegiate body of the Russian Orthodox Church, which has the responsibility of electing the Moscow Patriarch. In 1968 Filaret became Metropolitan of Kyiv and Galicia.

As late as October 1989, Filaret was still saying, "The Uniates will never be legalized in our country."

On May 3, 1990, Patriarch Pimen of Moscow died and, the same day, Filaret became the locum tenens of the Russian Orthodox Church. Filaret was not elected Patriarch of Moscow. Retrospectively, in 2019, Filaret declared "it was not by chance that I was not elected. The Lord prepared me for Ukraine"

On 27 October 1990, in a ceremony at St. Sophia Cathedral in Kyiv, the newly elected Patriarch Alexei II handed to Metropolitan Filaret a tomos granting "independence in self government" (the tomos did not use either of the words "autonomy" or "autocephaly") to Metropolitan Filaret, and enthroned Filaret, heretofore "Metropolitan of Kyiv", as "Metropolitan of Kyiv and All-Ukraine".

In 1992, the Russian Orthodox priest and Soviet dissident Fr. Gleb Yakunin accused Exarch Filaret of having been an informer for the KGB. Father Gleb stated that he had seen KGB files which listed Exarch Filaret's codename as Antonov. According to internal KGB documents, tasks the KGB assigned Filaret as an agent included promoting Soviet positions and candidates in the World Council of Churches (WCC), the Christian Peace Conference (CPC) and other international bodies, and, by the 1980s, backing the Soviet authorities’ attempts to prevent the long-suppressed Ukrainian Catholic Church (disparagingly called ‘Uniates’) from regaining an open existence, and backing state attempts to prevent religious believers demanding their rights as glasnost and perestroika opened up the sphere of public debate. In 2018, Filaret declared in an interview with Radio Liberty that he, like all bishops under communism, had to have contacts with the KGB. In 2019, he declared every bishop of the Moscow Patriarchate had to have contact with the KGB, even when it came to appoint a bishop. He added that he had been trained by the Politburo and Patriarch Alexy by the KGB.

Creation of the Ukrainian Orthodox Church - Kyiv Patriarchate 

Following Ukraine's declaration of independence from the Soviet Union on 24 August 1991, a national sobor of the Ukrainian Orthodox Church was held from November 1–3. At the sobor, the voting delegates, (who included all UOC bishops, clergy and lay delegates from each diocese; a delegate from each monastery and seminary, and recognized lay brotherhood) unanimously passed a resolution stating that henceforth the UOC would operate as an autocephalous church. A separate resolution, also unanimous, affirmed the church's desire for Metropolitan Filaret to become its Primate.

Filaret convened an assembly at the Kyiv Pechersk Lavra in January 1992 that adopted a request of autocephaly for Ukrainians to the Moscow Patriarch.

In March–April 1992, the Hierarchical Council of the Russian Orthodox Church met with a single agenda item: to consider the resolution passed by the UOC Sobor four months earlier. Although the issue itself was not discussed, Filaret was asked to resign. On the second day of the meeting, Metropolitan Filaret agreed to submit his resignation to the UOC Synod, and the ROC Synod passed a resolution which stated:

"The Council of Bishops took into account the statement of the Most Reverend Filaret, Metropolitan of Kyiv and of All-Ukraine, that for the sake of church peace, at the next Council of Bishops of the Ukrainian Orthodox Church, he will submit a request to be relieved from the position of the Primate of the UOC. Understanding of the position of Metropolitan Filaret, the Council of Bishops expressed to him its gratitude for the long period of labour as Archbishop of the See of Kyiv and blessed him to carry out his episcopal service in another diocese of the Ukrainian Orthodox Church."

However, after returning to Kyiv, Filaret recanted his resignation. On 14 April, Metropolitan Filaret held a press conference in which he alleged that undue pressure was exerted at the ROC Synod in Moscow, both directly and through threats made by FSK personnel who, he said, were present at the gathering. Filaret stated that he was retracting his resignation on the grounds that his resignation "would not bring peace to the Church, would contradict the will of the believers, and would be uncanonical."

Suspension and anathemization 
Shortly thereafter, the Russian Orthodox Church, unable to prevent the creation of what it viewed as a "schismatic church" in independent Ukraine, helped to organize a rival synod which was held in Kharkiv in May 1992. These bishops elected a bishop of the Russian Orthodox Church, Bishop Volodymyr (Sabodan), Metropolitan of Kyiv, and received recognition from Moscow as the Ukrainian Orthodox Church (Moscow Patriarchate).

Filaret was suspended on 27 May 1992 by the Ukrainian Orthodox Church (Moscow Patriarchate).  The bishops loyal to Metropolitan Filaret and a similar group from the Ukrainian Autocephalous Orthodox Church (another recently revived church in Ukraine) organized a unifying sobor which was held on 25 June 1992. The delegates agreed to form a combined church named the Ukrainian Orthodox Church - Kyiv Patriarchate (UOC-KP) under the patriarch they elected, Patriarch Mstyslav.

Filaret was defrocked by the Russian Orthodox Church on 11 July 1992. The UOC-KP was not recognized by other Orthodox churches and was considered schismatic.

Filaret was then anathemized by the Russian Orthodox Church in 1997. ROC officials stated that the anathematization of Filaret was "recognized by all the Local Orthodox Churches including the Church of Constantinople" The synod of the Ecumenical Patriarchate did indeed recognize, in a July 1992 letter to Patriarch Alexy II, the defrocking of Filaret by the ROC,  and the Ecumenical Patriarch recognized the anathemization of Filaret in a letter of April 1997 to Patriarch Alexy II. Filaret was also accused by the ROC of having a wife and three children, but it was "never proved".

Leadership of the Ukrainian Orthodox Church - Kyiv Patriarchate 

After the death of Patriarch Mstyslav in 1993, the church was headed by Patriarch Volodymyr, and in July 1995, upon the death of Volodymyr, Filaret was elected head of the UOC-KP by a vote of 160–5.

Metropolitan Filaret consecrated at least 85 bishops.

On 11 October 2018, the Holy Synod of the Ecumenical Patriarchate of Constantinople announced that Filaret Denisenko, along with the Primate of UAOC, had been "restored to communion with the Church." The decision of the Ecumenical Patriarchate also abolished the Moscow Patriarchate's jurisdiction over the diocese of Kyiv and hence all the bishops concerned were viewed by the Ecumenical Patriarchate as being under its jurisdiction.

On 20 October 2018, the UOC-KP changed the title of its head, to "His Holiness and Beatitude (name), Archbishop and Metropolitan of Kyiv – Mother of the Rus Cities and of Galicia, Patriarch of All Rus-Ukraine, Holy Archimandrite of the Holy Assumption Kyiv-Pechersk and Pochaev Lavras". The abridged form is "His Holiness (name), Patriarch of Kyiv and All Russia-Ukraine" and the form for interchurch relations "Archbishop, Metropolitan of Kyiv and All Rus'-Ukraine". The fact the full title and the version for interchurch relations mention the titles of "archbishop" and "metropolitan" and not the title of "patriarch", but that the abridged form mentioned only the title of "patriarch" has been confusing for some.  The Russian Orthodox Church reacted by commenting that this new title was a "farce" and that for them Filaret "was and remains a schismatic".

In the OCU 
On 15 December 2018, the hierarchs of the UAOC decided to dissolve the UAOC, and the hierarchs of the UOC-KP decided to dissolve the UOC-KP. This was done because on the same day the Ukrainian Autocephalous Orthodox Church, the Ukrainian Orthodox Church – Kyiv Patriarchate, and some members of the Ukrainian Orthodox Church (Moscow Patriarchate) were going to merge to form the Orthodox Church of Ukraine (OCU) after a unification council. Filaret was given the title of the "honorary patriarch" Orthodox Church of Ukraine. Volodymyr Burega, Professor and Vice-Rector of the Kyiv Theological Academy, explains this title this way: "in December [2018], no one wanted to aggravate relationships with Patriarch Philaret, since holding the council and receiving the Tomos were at stake. That is why the council, which took place on December 15, did not clarify the new status of Patriarch Filaret. After the unification council of the OCU, they stated that Filaret was henceforth "honorary patriarch", but what this phrase meant was difficult to understand. Indeed, such status is not stipulated in the Charter of the OCU, adopted on December 15."

On 18 December 2018, Filaret's 90th birthday, the 23rd of January 2019, was voted by the Ukrainian parliament as a day of national celebration for the year 2019.

On 16 January 2019, Filaret asked to be commemorated before Epiphanius, the primate of the OCU, during Divine Liturgies. He signed the document asking for it with "Filaret, Patriarch of Kyiv and All Rus-Ukraine" On 20 January 2019, Filaret declared in an interview when asked about his role in the Orthodox Church of Ukraine: "I am a patriarch, I have been and I remain a patriarch. Today, the Head of the Local Church is Metropolitan Epifaniy, but I do not refuse to participate in the development of the Ukrainian Church. I am an unrecognized patriarch for world Orthodoxy, but for Ukraine I am a patriarch and I remain a patriarch"

On 5 February 2019, the Holy Synod of the OCU appointed Filaret the diocesan bishop of Kyiv, except for the St. Michael's Golden-Domed Monastery.

In an interview published by BBC Ukraine on 1 March 2019, Epiphanius explained the situation around Filaret as follows:

Conflict 

A conflict erupted between Filaret and Epiphanius because of disagreements concerning the model of governance, the management of the diaspora, the name and the statute of the OCU.

According to Filaret, the agreement reached at the unification council was as follows: "the primate is responsible for the external representation of the Ukrainian Orthodox Church (UOC), and the patriarch is responsible for the internal church life in Ukraine, but in cooperation with the primate. The primate shall do nothing in the church without the consent of the patriarch. The patriarch chairs the meetings of the Holy Synod and the UOC meetings for the sake of preserving unity, its growth, and affirmation." Filaret considers this agreement has not been fulfilled.

Political views
In March 2014, Filaret publicly opposed the annexation of Crimea by Russia.

On 5 September 2014, amidst the 2014 Russian military intervention in Ukraine, Filaret held a service to consecrate a memorial cross to the Heavenly Hundred.   Filaret declared during his service that in the Orthodox church had appeared "among the rulers of this world [...] a real new Cain" who "calls himself a brother to the Ukrainian people, but in fact according to his deeds [...] really became the new Cain, shedding the brotherly blood and entangling the whole world with lies" and that "Satan went into him, as into Judas Iscariot". The statement was published on the official website of the Ukrainian Orthodox Church – Kyiv Patriarchate in English, Russian and Ukrainian. Publications such as Church Times, Cogwriter, and Ecumenical News identified Filaret's "new Cain" with Russian President Vladimir Putin.

Filaret said that the local population in Donbas "must pay for their guilt [in rejecting Kyiv’s authority] through suffering and blood".

COVID-19 
In March 2020, during a TV interview, Filaret called the COVID-19 pandemic a "divine punishment" for same-sex marriage. He was later sued by Kyiv-based LGBT-rights group InSight for his remarks. Early September 2020, it was announced that Filaret himself had been tested positive for COVID-19 and admitted to hospital.

In an interview released in March 2020 to the Ukraine Channel 4, he declared that the Holy Eucharist could be administrated from one spoon, because it is impossible to get viruses from the gloriously resurrected Body of Jesus Christ God.

Awards 

 Order "For intellectual courage" of the independent cultural magazine I (2018)

State awards

Ukraine 
  (2009)
 The Order of Prince Yaroslav the Wise 1st (2008), 2nd (2006), 3rd (2003), 4th (2001) and 5th (1999) Cl.
 The Cross of Ivan Mazepa (2011)
Hero of Ukraine (2019)

USSR 
 The Order of Friendship of Peoples (1980)
 The Order of the Red Banner of Labour (1988)

Notes

See also 

 History of Christianity in Ukraine
 List of Metropolitans and Patriarchs of Ukraine
Conflict between Filaret and Epiphanius

References

External links 

Patriarch of Kyiv and all Rus-Ukraine Filaret at the Institute of Religion and Society of the Ukrainian Catholic University
 Filaret (Denysenko) in The World of Religions .

1929 births
Living people
People from Donetsk Oblast
20th-century Eastern Orthodox bishops
21st-century Eastern Orthodox bishops
History of Christianity in Ukraine
Russian Orthodox clergy who spied for the Soviet Union
Ukrainian spies for the Soviet Union
First Hierarchs of the Ukrainian Orthodox Church of the Kyivan Patriarchate
Christian Peace Conference members
Recipients of the Order of Prince Yaroslav the Wise
Recipients of the Cross of Ivan Mazepa
First Hierarchs of the Ukrainian Orthodox Church (Moscow Patriarchate)
Russian Orthodox bishops of Kyiv
People excommunicated by the Russian Orthodox Church
Recipients of the title of Hero of Ukraine
Bishops of the Orthodox Church of Ukraine
Ukrainian Orthodox primates
Recipients of the Honorary Diploma of the Cabinet of Ministers of Ukraine